Jeff Johnson (born November 11, 1966) is an American lawyer and politician. He was elected to the Minnesota House of Representatives in 2000 and served there from 2001 to 2007. Johnson left the legislature to run for state attorney general in 2006, but was defeated. Johnson served as a Hennepin County commissioner for the 7th district from 2009 to 2021. He was elected as the Republican National Committeeman from Minnesota in April 2011. Johnson was the Republican nominee for governor of Minnesota in 2014, losing to incumbent Democrat Mark Dayton, and again in 2018, losing to the Democratic nominee, U.S. Representative Tim Walz.

Early life, education, and career 
Born in Detroit Lakes, Minnesota, Johnson graduated from Detroit Lakes High School in Minnesota in 1985. He received a triple Bachelor of Arts in economics and political science/history in 1989 from Concordia College and attended Georgetown University Law School, earning a J.D. in 1992.
  
Johnson then practiced at the law firms of Lord, Bissell and Brook in Chicago and Parsinen, Kaplan & Levy in Minneapolis. He joined Cargill in 1998, practicing employment and labor law until starting his own company, Midwest Employment Resources, providing employment law and human resources services to companies throughout the country.
  
In 2000, Johnson successfully ran for the Minnesota House of Representatives in district 34B, winning 62.8 percent of the vote for the seat vacated by Henry Todd Van Dellen, who had retired. In 2006 he ran for state attorney general, but lost to the DFL candidate, Lori Swanson, with 40.72% of the vote.

Republican National Committee 
In 2011, Johnson ran against Tom Emmer for the position of Minnesota's Republican National Committeeman, winning an upset victory. In 2012, he was elected without opposition to a full four-year term as Committeeman.

Minnesota House of Representatives 
First elected in 2000, Johnson served as Assistant Majority Leader from 2003 to 2007 and was chair of Civil Law and Elections Committee in the 84th Legislative Session.

2014 Minnesota gubernatorial campaign

On May 5, 2013, Johnson announced that he was running for governor. He received the Republican Party endorsement at their May 2014 convention, and defeated four other candidates in the August 12 primary to become the party's nominee to challenge incumbent Governor Mark Dayton. He was defeated in the November general election by a six-point margin.

2018 Minnesota gubernatorial campaign

On May 10, 2017, Johnson announced that he would again seek the Republican endorsement for governor of Minnesota. On June 2, 2018, the Republican Party of Minnesota formally endorsed him at their state convention in Duluth. On August 14, in what many political commentators considered an upset, Johnson defeated former governor Tim Pawlenty in the primary election to become the party's nominee. President Donald Trump then endorsed Johnson. He lost the general election to the Democratic nominee, U.S. Representative Tim Walz, by a ten-point margin.

Controversy
In March 2010, the Hennepin County Board tabled a request by Sheriff Rich Stanek to spend $426,150 to acquire the cellphone spying program KingFish. Johnson voted against tabling the motion, with the Star Tribune reporting that "Commissioner Jeff Johnson said he was convinced it was an important and useful law enforcement tool that wouldn’t violate privacy rights." Johnson was absent the day funding was finally approved. Johnson later wrote in a blog post that he was able to ask Stanek's office questions about KingFish and was "...quite comfortable with the answers" he received.

In December 2013, Johnson publicly repudiated his KingFish vote. While admitting that he had supported it, he said it was one of the "votes I might choose to change".

References

External links
 Campaign website for Governor in 2018
 GOP website

1966 births
20th-century American lawyers
21st-century American politicians
American labor lawyers
Concordia College (Moorhead, Minnesota) alumni
County commissioners in Minnesota
Georgetown University Law Center alumni
Living people
Republican Party members of the Minnesota House of Representatives
Minnesota lawyers
People from Detroit Lakes, Minnesota
Republican National Committee members
Candidates in the 2014 United States elections
Candidates in the 2018 United States elections